Asociația Fotbal Club Odorheiu Secuiesc, commonly known as AFC Odorheiu Secuiesc or simply Odorheiu Secuiesc, is a professional Romanian football club based in Odorheiu Secuiesc, Harghita County and also geographically placed in the historic and ethnographic region of Székely Land, an area inhabited mainly by Székelys, a subgroup of the Hungarian people.

The team was founded in 1922 as Textila Odorheiu Secuiesc and played for most of its existence in the third tier of the Romanian football league system. The only period in Liga II was spent during the 1973–74 season when the club was ranked 17th of 18 and was relegated back to Liga III. In 2004 the club was relegated to Liga IV and after some struggles, it was declared bankrupt and dissolved. On 12 December 2006, the new entity, AFC Odorheiu Secuiesc, was founded in order to try to ensure the continuity of the football tradition in Odorheiu Secuiesc. The club was recognized and accepted unanimously by supporters thus becoming the official successor of the old entity, Textila Odorheiu Secuiesc.

History

The original club (1922–2006)
History of the professional football started in Odorheiu Secuiesc in 1922, when it was founded the first team of the city, Textila. For almost 50 years the club struggled in the local and regional championships without remarkable results, but this was about to change in the summer of 1968 when after a very good campaign Lemnarul Odorheiu Secuiesc promoted to Divizia C for the first time in its history. In the first season, the team was ranked 4th of 16, then finished second at the end of 1972–73 season, right behind Gaz Metan Mediaș, being promoted for the first time to Divizia B. This beautiful dream would be disturbed after just one season, Textila proving to be an unprepared team for the challenges of this level and finished only 17th of 18.

In the summer of 1974, after the relegation from Divizia B, the leadership of the club decided to bring some fresh air inside the team and one of the measures was to change its name, from Textila Odorheiu Secuiesc to Progresul Odorheiu Secuiesc. After being ranked 8th at the end of the 1974–75 season, followed another second place in 1976, but this time was not a promoting place, the neighbors from Oltul Sfântu Gheorghe being the team which was going up. After four seasons in which at its best the team was ranked 3rd, Progresul finished again second, two times in a row, at the end of the 1980–81 and 1981–82 seasons, first time behind ICIM Brașov, then right after Precizia Săcele. In these conditions when the team seemed to force the promotion to the second tier again, relegated unexpectedly in 1983, after finishing 15th of 16. Interestingly, it's the same year in which the other team from Harghita County, Tractorul Miercurea Ciuc also relegated. Progresul promoted back after only one year of absence and for the next seven years imposed itself as a strong opponent, being ranked generally in top five of its series, two times even finishing in second place (1987–88 and 1988–89).

In the summer of 1991, the club changed its name again, this time from Progresul Odorheiu Secuiesc to Harghita Odorheiu Secuiesc. Odorheienii continued their Divizia C spell but at its best, the team was ranked third. After two weak seasons, 1996–97 – 15th and 1997–98 – 18th, the team has gone through some administrative changes and in the summer of 1998 changed its name from Harghita Odorheiu Secuiesc to Budvar Odorheiu Secuiesc. In six years as "Budvar" the team finished only one time in top 10 (2000–01 – 5th), the mediocre results culminating in a relegation to Divizia D at the end of the 2003–04 season, after exactly 20 years spent in the third tier. During the next two years the football from the city struggled to survive, in 2006, the team of SC Roseal SA company, CS Roseal Odorheiu Secuiesc promoted to Liga III, but can't survive at this level and after only one season relegated back.

Refoundation and recent years (2006–present)
On 12 December 2006, at the initiative of some local football managers and supporters, a new entity, named AFC Odorheiu Secuiesc, was founded to be the successor of the old club, known over time as Textila, Progresul, Harghita or Budvar. The founding members of the football club, in its current form, were: Csaba Albert, Lajos Balázs, Attila Berkeczi, Csaba Dénes and Domokos Jankó.

Odorheienii promoted to Liga III at the end of 2008–09 season, but after only three seasons relegated back to Liga IV, in the last one, 2011–12, being even excluded from the league until the winter break due to financial problems. After another three seasons spent in the county league, the Székelys promoted to the third tier in 2015 after winning its county league and the promotion playoff match against Nemere Ghelința, Covasna County champions, 7–1 on aggregate.

After promotion the black and orange team obtained the following rankings: 12th (2015–16), 12th (2016–17) and 11th (2017–18).

Grounds
AFC Odorheiu Secuiesc plays its home matches on Municipal Stadium in Odorheiu Secuiesc, with a capacity of 5,000 seats.

Honours
Liga III
Winners (1): 2021–22
Runners-up (6): 1972–73, 1975–76, 1980–81, 1981–82, 1987–88, 1988–89 
Liga IV – Harghita County
Winners (2): 1983–84, 2014–15
Runners-up (1): 2013–14

Regional Championship
Winners (1): 1967–68

Players

First team squad

Out on loan

Club officials

Board of directors

Current technical staff

League history

|valign="top" width=0%|

|}

References

External links
 Official website
 

Football clubs in Harghita County
Association football clubs established in 1922
Liga II clubs
Liga III clubs
Liga IV clubs
1922 establishments in Romania
Odorheiu Secuiesc